GreenPeak Technologies was an Utrecht, Netherlands-based fabless company developing semiconductor products and software for the IEEE 802.15.4 and Zigbee wireless market segment.  Zigbee technology is used for Smart Home data communications and to facilitate the Internet of Things, the term used to refer to devices designed to be operated and managed by internet-enabled controllers and management systems.

Industry standards 
Wireless sensor applications prosper best within the sphere of industry standards. Standards offer OEMs the freedom to purchase from a larger pool of suppliers and most importantly, standards allow devices from different vendors to interoperate, a feature which is paramount in applications ranging from building automation to industrial automation.

GreenPeak's development is based on open industry standards in addition to the IEEE 802.15.4 wireless network standard. GreenPeak is a member of the Global Semiconductor Alliance and supports the open global standards of the Zigbee Alliance.

Products 
GreenPeak’s product offering contains communication controller chips for Zigbee Smart Home and IoT applications for IEEE 802.15.4. 
The product portfolio features small size, ultra low-power communications chips, with integrated software, tools and reference designs for seamless integration into residential and consumer electronics applications.

Acquisition by Qorvo 
On 17 April 2016, it was announced that GreenPeak had agreed to be acquired by Qorvo. After the acquisition, GreenPeak would continue to function in the Netherlands, Belgium and Hong Kong as the "Low-power Wireless Systems" business unit in the Infrastructure and Defense Products (IDP) group of Qorvo. Cees Links, former CEO of GreenPeak Technologies, was announced to take over as the General Manager of the Wireless Connectivity business unit.

References

External links 
 
 Zigbee Alliance
 IEEE 802.15.4
 World Economic Forum Technology Pioneer GreenPeak Technology Pioneer in category Energy & Environment
 Deloitte Deloitte Fast 50 Winner 2014
 EEweb Shaping Smart Homes of the future
 ON World ZigBee will lead the wireless sensor network market to 1 billion units in 2017
 Frost and Sullivan About GreenPeak
 Gimv GreenPeak in Gimv cleantech and technology investment fund portfolio
 EETimes The Smart Home gets another standard
 Embedded Magazine Bringing the three flavors of ZigBee together in the smart home
 Electronic Specifier Who will win the battle of the IoT standards?
 White paper The Power of ZigBee 3.0
 White paper The different IoT wireless communication standards explained
 White paper Sentrollers, and the world of Small Data
 White paper Smart Home Networking

Companies based in Utrecht (province)
Home automation companies
Wireless sensor network
Fabless semiconductor companies
Semiconductor companies of the Netherlands
Dutch brands